Construction engineering, also known as construction operations, is a professional subdiscipline of civil engineering that deals with the designing, planning, construction, and operations management of infrastructure such as roadways, tunnels, bridges, airports, railroads, facilities, buildings, dams, utilities and other projects. Construction engineers learn some of the design aspects similar to civil engineers as well as project management aspects.

At the educational level, civil engineering students concentrate primarily on the design work which is more analytical, gearing them toward a career as a design professional. This essentially requires them to take a multitude of challenging engineering science and design courses as part of obtaining a 4-year accredited degree. Education for construction engineers is primarily focused on construction procedures, methods, costs, schedules and personnel management. Their primary concern is to deliver a project on time within budget and of the desired quality.

Regarding educational requirements, construction engineering students take basic design courses in civil engineering, as well as construction management courses.

Work activities
Being a sub-discipline of civil engineering, construction engineers apply their knowledge and business, technical and management skills obtained from their undergraduate degree to oversee projects that include bridges, buildings and housing projects. Construction engineers are heavily involved in the design and management/ allocation of funds in these projects. They are charged with risk analysis, costing and planning. A career in design work does require a professional engineer license (PE). Individuals who pursue this career path are strongly advised to sit for the Engineer in Training exam (EIT), also, referred to as the Fundamentals of Engineering Exam (FE) while in college as it takes five years' (4 years in USA) post-graduate to obtain the PE license. Some states have recently changed the PE license exam pre-requisite of 4 years work experience after graduation to become a licensed Professional Engineer where an EIT is eligible to take the PE Exam in as little as 6 months after taking the FE exam.

Entry-level construction engineers position is typically project engineers or assistant project engineers. They are responsible for preparing purchasing requisitions, processing change orders, preparing monthly budgeting reports and handling meeting minutes. The construction management position does not necessarily require a PE license; however, possessing one does make the individual more marketable, as the PE license allows the individual to sign off on temporary structure designs.

Abilities
Construction engineers are problem solvers. They contribute to the creation of infrastructure that best meets the unique demands of its environment. They must be able to understand infrastructure life cycles. When compared and contrasted to design engineers, construction engineers bring to the table their own unique perspectives for solving technical challenges with clarity and imagination. While individuals considering this career path should certainly have a strong understanding of mathematics and science, many other skills are also highly desirable, including critical and analytical thinking, time management, people management and good communication skills.

Educational requirements
Individuals looking to obtain a construction engineering degree must first ensure that the program is accredited by the Accreditation Board for Engineering and Technology (ABET). ABET accreditation is assurance that a college or university program meets the quality standards established by the profession for which it prepares its students. In the US there are currently twenty-five programs that exist in the entire country so careful college consideration is advised.

A typical construction engineering curriculum is a mixture of engineering mechanics, engineering design, construction management and general science and mathematics. This usually leads to a Bachelor of Science degree. The B.S. degree along with some design or construction experience is sufficient for most entry-level positions. Graduate schools may be an option for those who want to go further in depth of the construction and engineering subjects taught at the undergraduate level. In most cases construction engineering graduates look to either civil engineering, engineering management or business administration as a possible graduate degree.

Job prospects
Job prospects for construction engineers generally have a strong cyclical variation. For example, starting in 2008 and continuing until at least 2011, job prospects have been poor due to the collapse of housing bubbles in many parts of the world. This sharply reduced demand for construction, forced construction professionals towards infrastructure construction and therefore increased the competition faced by established and new construction engineers. This increased competition and a core reduction in quantity demand is in parallel with a possible shift in the demand for construction engineers due to the automation of many engineering tasks, overall resulting in reduced prospects for construction engineers. In early 2010, the United States construction industry had a 27% unemployment rate, this is nearly three times higher than the 9.7% national average unemployment rate. The construction unemployment rate (including tradesmen) is comparable to the United States 1933 unemployment rate—the lowest point of the Great Depression—of 25%.

Remuneration
The average salary for a civil engineer in the UK depends on the sector and more specifically the level of experience of the individual. A 2010 survey of the remuneration and benefits of those occupying jobs in construction and the built environment industry showed that the average salary of a civil engineer in the UK is £29,582. In the United States, as of May 2013, the average was $85,640. The average salary varies depending on experience, for example the average annual salary for a civil engineer with between 3 and 6 years' experience is £23,813. For those with between 14 and 20 years' experience the average is £38,214.

See also
 Architectural engineering
 Building officials
 Civil engineering
 Construction communication
 Construction estimating software
 Construction law
 Construction management
 Cost engineering
 Cost overrun
 Earthquake engineering
 Engineering, procurement and construction (EPC)
 Engineering, procurement, construction and installation, (EPCI)
 Index of construction articles
 International Building Code
 Military engineering
 Quantity surveyor
 Structural engineering
 Work breakdown structure

References

Construction and extraction occupations
Engineering disciplines
Civil engineering
Building engineering
Construction management
Transportation engineering